Theristicus is a genus of birds in the family Threskiornithidae. They are found in open, grassy habitats in South America. All have a long, decurved dark bill, relatively short reddish legs that do not extend beyond the tail in flight (unlike e.g. Eudocimus and Plegadis), and at least the back is grey.

Taxonomy
The genus Theristicus was erected by the German naturalist Johann Georg Wagler in 1832 with the black-faced ibis as the type species. The name is from the Ancient Greek theristikos meaning "of reaping". The genus contains four species.

References

 Matheu, E., & J. del Hoyo (1992). Family Threskiornithidae (Ibises and Spoonbills). pp. 472–506 in: del Hoyo, J., A. Elliott, & J. Sargatal (editors). Handbook of the Birds of the World. Vol. 1. Ostrich to Ducks. Lynx Edicions, Barcelona. 

 
 
Bird genera

Taxonomy articles created by Polbot